Eremophila warnesii is a flowering plant in the figwort family, Scrophulariaceae and is endemic to Western Australia. It is an erect, compact shrub with furry leaves, hairy sepals and blue to mauve petals. It is a little-known species, named after the founder of the Eremophila Study Group.

Description
Its branches and leaves are covered with a thick layer of fine white to silvery-grey branched hairs and simple hairs which are up to ) long. The branches are rough due to persistent leaf bases.

The flowers are borne singly in leaf axils and lack a stalk. The petal tube and its lobes are lilac-coloured to light purple or blue-mauve, with pale purple spots inside the tube. The outside of the tube and lobes is densely covered with branched hairs, the inside surface of the lobes is glabrous and the inside of the tube is densely woolly. The 4 stamens are fully enclosed in the petal tube.

Taxonomy and naming 
The species was first formally described by Robert Chinnock in 2007 and the description was published in Eremophila and Allied Genera: A Monograph of the Plant Family Myoporaceae. The specific epithet (warnesii) honours Ken Warnes who founded the Eremophila Study Group associated with the Society for Growing Australian Plants (now Australian Native Plants Society (Australia).

Distribution and habitat 
This eremophila occurs near Mount Gould Station and Mount Clere Station north-west of Meekatharra in the Gascoyne and Murchison biogeographic regions where it grows in open mulga woodland.

Conservation
Eremophila warnesii is classified as "Priority One" by the Western Australian Government Department of Parks and Wildlife, meaning that it is known from only one or a few locations which are potentially at risk.

Use in horticulture
This eremophila has attractive silvery-grey foliage and large pale lilac to purple flowers. It is not widely cultivated but can be propagated from cuttings in summer or by grafting onto Myoporum rootstock. It grows best in well-drained soil in a sunny location and is tolerant of drought and of light frost.

References

Eudicots of Western Australia
warnesii
Endemic flora of Western Australia
Plants described in 2007
Taxa named by Robert Chinnock